The Insular Mountains are a range of mountains in the Pacific Coast Ranges on the Coast of British Columbia, Canada, comprising the Vancouver Island Ranges and Queen Charlotte Mountains.

Although the Coast Mountain Range is usually referred to as the westernmost range of the Pacific Cordillera (since it is the westernmost range on the main landmass at that point), the Insular Mountains are the true westernmost range.

Geological history
These Insular Mountains are not yet fully emerged above sea level, and Vancouver Island and the Haida Gwaii are just the higher elevations of the range, which was in fact fully exposed during the last glacial period (maximum ice extent about 18,000 years ago) when the continental shelf in this area was a broad coastal plain.

The Insular Mountains formed when a chain of active volcanic islands (the Insular Islands) collided against the North American continent during the mid Cretaceous period. The type of rocks that form the Insular Mountains are turbidites and pillow lavas. Granitic plutons seldom occur in the Insular Mountains, unlike the Coast Mountains. The Insular Mountain range covers some 133,879 km2 (51,691 sq mi).  It experiences frequent seismic activity, with the Pacific Plate and the Juan de Fuca Plate being subducted into the Earth's mantle. Large earthquakes have led to collapsing mountains, landslides and fissures.

During the last glacial period, ice enclosed nearly all of these mountains. Glaciers that ran down to the Pacific Ocean sharpened the valley faces and eroded their bottoms. These valleys were transformed into fjords when the ice melted and the sea level rose. Ice Age remnants may still be noted, such as the Comox Glacier in the Vancouver Island Ranges.

Sub-ranges

Haida Gwaii
Queen Charlotte Mountains, on Haida Gwaii:
Cameron Range: On the western side of Graham Island
Crease Range: On north-central Graham Island
McKay Range: On the south coast of Graham Island
San Christoval Range: On the western side of Moresby Island

Vancouver Island

Vancouver Island Ranges, on Vancouver Island:
Refugium Range:  On the Brooks Peninsula
Sophia Range: On Nootka Island, on the peninsula between Esperanza Inlet and Nuchatlitz Inlet
Genevieve Range: Nootka Island
Karmutzen Range: Between Nimpkish Lake, Tlakwa Creek and Karmuzten Creek
Hankin Range: Between Nimpkish Lake and Bonanza Lake
Franklin Range:  Near Robson Bight on the Johnstone Strait between the Tsitika River and Kokish River
Bonanza Range:  Between the Nimpkish River and the Tsitika River by Bonanza Lake
Sutton Range: Between Nimpkish River,  White River,  Oktwanch River, Gold River
Newcastle Range: Johnstone Strait, west of Sayward-Kelsey Bay and east/north of Adams River
Prince of Wales Range: East coast of Vancouver Island 40 km (25 mi) north of Campbell River
Halifax Range: Along Johnstone Strait between Amor de Cosmos Creek and Pye Creek
Beaufort Range: North of Port Alberni and west of Qualicum Beach
Pelham Range:  Between the Sarita River and Alberni Inlet
Somerset Range: Between The Pacheena-Sarita River basins and the Klanawa River (between Nitinat Lake and Imperial Eagle Channel)
Seymour Range: Between the valley of Cowichan Lake, San Juan River and Gordon River
Gowlland Range:  Near Victoria between Saanich Inlet and Brentwood Bay. Includes Mount Work Regional Park
Pierce Range:  South of Gold River between the Jacklah River and the Burman River
Haihte Range: Between Tashsis River, the Nomash River, Zeballos Lake and Woss Lake

The Elk River Mountains, located in Strathcona Provincial Park, are sometimes classified as a range.

See also
Volcanism in Canada
Geology of the Pacific Northwest

References

 
Pacific Coast Ranges
Mountain ranges of British Columbia
South Coast of British Columbia
Landforms of Vancouver Island
Landforms of Haida Gwaii